Tse Tin Yau (born 31 July 1991 in Hong Kong) is a professional footballer who plays in the Hong Kong First Division League for Fourway. His position is right-back or right midfielder.

Career statistics

Club career

References

1991 births
Living people
Hong Kong footballers
Fourway Athletics players
Hong Kong First Division League players

Association football midfielders
Association football defenders